The Bethnal Green trio are Amira Abase, Shamima Begum, and Kadiza Sultana, three British girls who attended the Bethnal Green Academy in London before leaving home in February 2015 to join the Islamic State. According to the Institute for Strategic Dialogue, they were among an estimated 550 women and girls from Western countries who had travelled to join IS—part of what some have called "a jihadi, girl-power subculture", the so-called Brides of ISIL. The events were adapted into the Swedish TV series Caliphate.

Background

On 17 February 2015, Abase, Begum, and Sultana flew via Turkish Airlines from Gatwick Airport in West Sussex, England, to Istanbul, Turkey. Their families went to Turkey in March to investigate their disappearance, deeming the police investigation inadequate.

Their disappearance has been attributed to Aqsa Mahmood, a woman from Glasgow who joined ISIL in 2013. There were electronic communications between the girls and Mahmood. Mahmood faces criminal charges if she returns. Mahmood denies the allegations.

In March 2015, footage was circulated of Abase Hussen, father of Amira Abase, at a 2012 rally led by Islamist preacher Anjem Choudary against the film Innocence of Muslims. The Metropolitan Police examined the footage but said that it was unlikely that offences had been committed. Hussen said in April that he felt ashamed of his involvement in the rally, as he did not know who had organised it.

The girls stole family jewellery to pay for their flights. Begum married Dutch Islamic convert and IS jihadi fighter Yago Riedijk just days after arriving in Raqqa. They had three children who died from malnutrition and disease.

At a 2015 Home Affairs Select Committee, then Metropolitan Police Commissioner Bernard Hogan-Howe stated that they would not face criminal charges if they returned to the United Kingdom.

Aftermath

In the UK, the disappearance resulted in the Metropolitan Police giving evidence to the Home Affairs Select Committee of the House of Commons on its circumstances in March 2015. The families of the girls received an apology from Scotland Yard, who did not tell them about Sharmeena Begum (unrelated), the other girl from their school who went to Syria in 2014.

British Prime Minister David Cameron said that individual institutions should not be made into "scapegoats" for the disappearance of the three girls. Contrary to the stance of the Metropolitan Police, Cameron said, "Whoever has gone out to join a terrorist organisation is breaking the law and has to face the consequences of breaking the law and we have to let the law take its course in the proper way".

In March 2015, a travel ban was imposed upon five girls from the Bethnal Green Academy due to concerns from social services that the girls attend the same school as the three who had already joined the group, stating that it was in the public interest.

It was reported that the Bethnal Green Trio were married to foreign jihadists, and that they then moved into the homes of their new husbands in ISIL's de facto capital of Raqqa.

Sultana was said to have married a western ISIL fighter with Somali heritage, but wanted to return to the UK after he was killed in battle. Shortly afterwards, she was killed in a Russian airstrike. Her family said in a phone interview with ITV in August 2016 that they believed she died in an airstrike in May 2016 at the age of 17 while planning to escape. The lawyer who represents the family of the teenagers, Tasnime Akunjee, told ITV that she became too scared of making an escape attempt after another girl, Samra Kesinovic, was beaten to death for trying to escape.

Abase married an 18-year-old Australian jihadist, Abdullah Elmir, in July 2016 who was reported by Australian intelligence agencies to have been killed in coalition airstrikes. The current fate or whereabouts of Abase are unknown.

Shamima Begum married a Dutch jihadist recruit, Yago Riedijk. They had three children, all now deceased.

In February 2019, The Times journalist Anthony Loyd found Begum in a Syrian refugee camp. During the interview, Begum said the last time she saw her husband was when they fled the village of Baghuz, Isis’ final stronghold, at the beginning of February that year.  He was later reported to have surrendered to fighters allied with the Syrian Democratic Forces. She also revealed that she was pregnant and hoped to return to the UK to raise her child but did not regret her decision to join ISIL. In the debate that followed, the UK Home Office announced it would revoke her UK citizenship, while Bangladesh did not recognize her as a citizen.

As of November 11, 2022, Begum is being held in a detention camp in the northeastern part of Syria near her imprisoned husband.  Samantha Knights KC, the lawyer for Begum, stated Begum was a victim of sex trafficking lured by Islamic State propaganda.  Sir James Eadie KC of the Home Office stated Begum is a threat to national security with an MI5 agent reporting it was inconceivable that Begum did not know ISIL was a terrorist organization due to the number of terror attacks and public beheadings being posted in the news at the time they left Britain.

See also
Begum v Home Secretary
United Kingdom and ISIL
Brides of ISIL
Caliphate (TV series)

References

External links
 
 
 
 
 

2015 in the United Kingdom
British children
British expatriates in Syria
English Islamists
Trio
Trios
Year of birth missing (living people)
Living people